Normal Hall, also known as Ladoga Normal School, Ladoga High School, and American Legion Post #324, is a historic school building located at Ladoga, Montgomery County, Indiana. It was built in 1878, and is a two-story, three bay by six bay, Greek Revival / Italianate style brick building.  It has a hipped roof topped by an open cupola, originally a bell tower added in 1907. It is the only remaining building associated with the Central Indiana Normal School, which relocated in 1878 to Danville, Indiana to become Canterbury College.  It housed local schools until 1917, then housed an armory, and an American Legion post after 1944.

It was listed on the National Register of Historic Places in 1996.

References

School buildings on the National Register of Historic Places in Indiana
Italianate architecture in Indiana
Greek Revival architecture in Indiana
School buildings completed in 1878
Buildings and structures in Montgomery County, Indiana
National Register of Historic Places in Montgomery County, Indiana
Canterbury College (Indiana)
1878 establishments in Indiana